Stockland Bristol (formerly Stockland Gaunts) is a village and civil parish in the Sedgemoor district of Somerset, between Bridgwater and the Steart Peninsula.

History

It was recorded in the Domesday book as Stocheland meaning 'A stockade with land' from the Old English stoc and land. The name Bristol was added later from its medieval owner, Bristol Corporation.

Stockland Bristol was part of the hundred of Cannington.  In the early 13th century the manor of Stockland was held by Maurice de Gaunt (d.1230), who left it in his will to St Mark's Hospital, Bristol, later known as Gaunts Hospital.  In 1541 the manor was granted to Bristol Corporation, which held it until 1839.

The village lies on Combwich Reach as the River Parrett flows to the sea. The Steart peninsula has flooded many times during the last millennium. The most severe recent floods occurred in 1981. By 1997, a combination of coastal erosion, sea level rise and wave action had made some of the defences distinctly fragile and at risk from failure. As a result, in 2002 the Environment Agency produced the Stolford to Combwich Coastal Defence Strategy Study to examine options for the future.

In the early part of World War II Stockland Bristol was chosen by the  Radio Security Service (RSS) as the site for two wireless Direction Finding (D/F) stations known as Y-stations. They were located in the fields alongside Steart Road. These installations would have been used to locate the source of enemy radio transmissions. They were demolished after 1945.

Governance

The parish council has responsibility for local issues, including setting an annual precept (local rate) to cover the council's operating costs and producing annual accounts for public scrutiny. The parish council evaluates local planning applications and works with the local police, district council officers, and neighbourhood watch groups on matters of crime, security, and traffic. The parish council's role also includes initiating projects for the maintenance and repair of parish facilities, as well as consulting with the district council on the maintenance, repair, and improvement of highways, drainage, footpaths, public transport, and street cleaning. Conservation matters (including trees and listed buildings) and environmental issues are also the responsibility of the council.

The village falls within the Non-metropolitan district of Sedgemoor, which was formed on 1 April 1974 under the Local Government Act 1972, having previously been part of Bridgwater Rural District, which is responsible for local planning and building control, local roads, council housing, environmental health, markets and fairs, refuse collection and recycling, cemeteries and crematoria, leisure services, parks, and tourism.

Somerset County Council is responsible for running the largest and most expensive local services such as education, social services, libraries, main roads, public transport, policing and  fire services, trading standards, waste disposal and strategic planning.

It is also part of the Bridgwater and West Somerset county constituency represented in the House of Commons of the Parliament of the United Kingdom. It elects one Member of Parliament (MP) by the first past the post system of election.

Religious sites

The original church was demolished in 1865 with only the font and chancel screen preserved in the new church.

References

External links

 Stockland Bristol at British History Online

Villages in Sedgemoor
Somerset Levels
Civil parishes in Somerset